The Tent Partnership for Refugees, previously known as the Tent Foundation, is a non-profit organization founded by Hamdi Ulukaya, the founder and CEO of Chobani Yogurt. It is a coalition of businesses that have committed to take action to help refugees.

Established in 2016 and headquartered in New York City, the organization brings together companies to improve the lives of refugees. The Tent Partnership encourages businesses to play a more active role in addressing the crisis by hiring refugees, integrating them into supply chains, supporting refugee entrepreneurs, and delivering services to them.

History

In 2015, Chobani's CEO and founder, Hamdi Ulukaya, signed the Giving Pledge, committing to give the majority of his personal wealth to help end the global refugee crisis. He founded the Tent Foundation for this purpose.  In 2016, the Tent Foundation incorporated the private sector commitments announced in response to President Obama's 2016 Call to Action for Private Sector Engagement on the Global Refugee Crisis.

The Tent Partnership for Refugees was launched in 2016 at the World Economic Forum in Davos. The inaugural members of the Tent Alliance included Airbnb, Becton Dickinson, Chobani, Cotopaxi, Henry Schein, the IKEA Foundation, Johnson & Johnson, LinkedIn, MasterCard, Pearson, UPS, and Western Union. Since 2016, this group has grown to more than 100 companies, including companies such as Salesforce,  Deloitte, WeWork, and Starbucks.

See also 

 Welcome.US

References

External links 

 Official website

Foundations based in the United States
Organizations established in 2015
Charities based in New York City
Refugee aid organizations in the United States